Forcalquier is a commune in the Alpes-de-Haute-Provence department in southeastern France.

During the Middle Ages it was the capital of Haute-Provence.

History

Furnus Calcarius was the Latin name, from the lime kilns used in Roman times. (A Roman bridge still stands in the valley to the south of the town.) Its Provençal name is Fourcauquié. At the end of the 11th century, a family of the counts of Provence created the county of Forcalquier.

During this time, the town of Forcalquier was the capital of Haute Provence along the Durance, which included the towns of Manosque, Sisteron, Gap and Embrun. Forcalquier minted its own currency, and its church was elevated to the status of a "concathedral".

The counts of Forcalquier grew to a power that could defy the counts of Provence. Rivalry ended in 1195 when Gersende de Sabran, countess of Forcalquier, married Alfonso II, count of Provence. Their son, Ramon Bérenger IV, inherited the two counties.

Population

The inhabitants are called Forcalquiérens in French.

Sights
Forcalquier is built around the slopes of a steep conical hill, crowned by an octagonal chapel, Notre Dame de Provence, where the medieval citadel once stood. The citadel was destroyed in 1601; the chapel with its panoramic view was built in 1875. It has a carillon that can be heard every Sunday morning during the summer.

The oldest part of the town is the area around the Place Saint-Michel with its Renaissance fountain (1511) and its narrow side-streets. There many doorways dating to the 12th to 16th centuries can be found.

The present commercial and social center of town, the Place du Bourget, is located below the Place St. Michel. The 12th century "concathedral" Notre Dame de l'Assomption with its bell towers stands across from the Place du Bourguet.

The Cordeliers Convent was built in the 13th century by Franciscans named "cordeliers" because of their rope belts. This convent was occupied by monks continuously until the Revolution. It now houses the Université Européenne des Senteurs & Saveurs. The Port de Cordeliers is all that remains of the town's fortified walls.

Monday morning is market day in Forcalquier. The market fills the Place du Bourguet and the adjoining streets.

Noteworthy is the Musée Municipal with its prehistoric and Gallo-Roman artifacts, glass works, and faïence pottery from Mane, Apt and Moustiers-Sainte-Marie.

Personalities
Geoffrey II of Provence (died 1067)
Alfonso II, Count of Provence (1180–1209)
Garsenda of Forcalquier (c. 1180 – c. 1242), Countess of Forcalquier from 1209
Ramon Berenguer IV, Count of Provence (1198–1245)
Jaufre Reforzat de Trets (fl. 1213–1237)
Marguerite of Provence (1221–1295)
Guigues VII of Viennois (1225–1269)
Charles I of Naples (1226/1227–1285)
Joan I of Naples (1326/1327–1382)
Ladislaus of Naples (1377–1414)
Louis III of Naples (1403–1434)
Louis Feuillée (1660–1732), explorer and scientist
Raoul Dufy (1877–1953), Fauvist painter
David Galloway (1937–2019), writer
Christophe Castaner (born 1966), politician

International relations

Forcalquier is officially twinned with:
  Guastalla, Italy

See also

Communes of the Alpes-de-Haute-Provence department
Henri Bardouin

References

External links

 Tourism office website
 Provence Beyond: Forcalquier
Provence Web: Forcalquier
Radio Zinzine: Public radio located in Forcalquier

Communes of Alpes-de-Haute-Provence
Subprefectures in France
Alpes-de-Haute-Provence communes articles needing translation from French Wikipedia